The following is the list of cities in Tajikistan that underwent a name change in the past.

Dushanbe → Stalinabad (1929) → Dushanbe (1961)
Khodjend → Leninabad (1939) → Khujand (1991)
Kurgan-Tyube → Qurghonteppa (1993) → Bokhtar (2018)
Sovietabad → Ghafurov (1978)
Ura-Tyube → Istaravshan (2001)
Yangi-Bazar → Orjonikidzeabad (1936) → Qofarnihon (1992) → Vahdat (2003)
(Tabashar) → (Istiqlol) (2012)  
(Nurek) → (Norak) (1993) 
(Kulyab) → (Kulob) (1993) 
(Regar) → (Tursunzade) (1972) → Турсунзода (Tursunzoda) (1993) 
(Chkalovsk) → (Chkalov) (1993) → Buston
(Pendjikent) → (Panjakent) (1993) 
(Kalininabad) → (Sarband) (1996) → Levakant

See also

List of renamed cities in Kazakhstan
List of renamed cities in Kyrgyzstan
List of renamed cities in Turkmenistan
List of renamed cities in Uzbekistan

External links
Name Changes in Tajikistan - Tajikistan Update
Historic and demographic data of urban centers in Tajikistan - including name changes

 
Tajikistan geography-related lists
Tajikistan, Renamed
Renamed, Tajikistan
Tajikistan